XP Power is a manufacturer and supplier of critical power control systems. It is listed on the London Stock Exchange.

History
The company was founded by James Peters in 1988. It was the subject of an initial public offer on the London Stock Exchange in 2000 and went on to acquire Emco, a US-based power supplies business, for $12 million in November 2015, and Comdel, another US-based power supplies business, for $23 million purchase in October 2017. It also bought Glassman, a US-based supplier of higher-voltage power supplies equipment, for £32 million in May 2018. It has been selected to join the FTSE 250 Index of leading companies in March 2020.

Operations
The company has manufacturing facilities at Kunshan in China and at Ho Chi Minh City in Vietnam.

References

External links
Official site

Companies established in 1988
Companies listed on the London Stock Exchange